Micro-cap may refer to:

Microcap stock, a market term
Micro-Cap, a circuit simulator